Klaus Meyer (born 21 January 1954) is a German rower. He competed in the men's coxless four event at the 1976 Summer Olympics.

References

1954 births
Living people
German male rowers
Olympic rowers of West Germany
Rowers at the 1976 Summer Olympics
Rowers from Cologne